Louis, Prince of Condé may refer to:

 Louis, Prince of Condé (1530–1569), Huguenot leader and general
 Louis, Prince of Condé (1621–1686)
 Louis, Prince of Condé (1668–1710)